This article lists events from the year 2021 in Niger.

Incumbents
President
Mahamadou Issoufou
Mohamed Bazoum, starting April 2
Prime Minister: Brigi Rafini

Events

January to June
January 2 – One hundred people including dozens of civilians, were killed by unidentified terrorists in Tchombangou and Zaroumdareye in Tillabéri Region.
January 4 – Three days of mourning are declared for the victims of the January 2 terrorist attacks.
February 21 – 2020–21 Nigerien general election second round. Seven members of the National Electoral Commission are killed and three injured when their car hits an explosive device in Dargol.
February 24 – Opposition leader Mahamane Ousmane declares he won the election the day after the Independent National Electoral Commission (CENI) announced former interior minister Mohamed Bazoum had won. CENI says Bazoum had 55.75% of the vote and Ousmane had 44.25%, but the latter claims there was fraud.
February 26 – Mohamed Bazoum rules out a power-sharing deal with the opposition and blames it for bringing children from rural areas for post-election protests. Two people died and 400 were arrested during election violence.
March 8 – President Mahamadou Issoufou wins the 2020 Ibrahim Prize for Achievement in African Leadership.
March 21 – Suspected jihadists attack three villages in Tahoua Region, killing 137. Last week 58 people were killed when gunmen attacked a bus in Tillabéri Region.
March 31 - 2021 Nigerien coup d'état attempt
April 2 – Mohamed Bazoum is sworn in as president after failed coup attempt.
April 3 – The Niger human rights commission calls for an independent inquiry following alleged rapes, including that of an 11-year old girl, by Chadian soldiers deployed to help fight armed groups.

July to December

October 13 - Mosque massacre kills 10 in Tillaberi. 
November 7 - Niger gold mine collapse
November 8 - Maradi school fire

Scheduled and planned events

Culture

Deaths

See also
COVID-19 pandemic in Africa
Economic Community of West African States
Community of Sahel–Saharan States
G5 Sahel
Boko Haram

References

External links
Niger - Election Just the Start of Challenges for New President (By Cristina Krippahl, DW, December 22, 2020)

 
Niger
Niger
2020s in Niger
Years of the 21st century in Niger